The Cimicomorpha are an infraorder of insects in the order Hemiptera, the true bugs. The rostrum and other morphology of all members apparently is adapted to feeding on animals as their prey or hosts.  Members include bed bugs, bat bugs, assassin bugs, and pirate bugs.

The two infraorders Cimicomorpha and Pentatomorpha have very similar characteristics, possibly as a result of the evolution of plant feeding. The key similarity that unites the Cimicomorpha and Pentatomorpha is the loss of the arolia (adhesive pads) on the pretarsi of the insects. These two infraorders comprise 90% of Heteroptera species.

These insects are a part of the old, informal classification of “Geocorisae” (land bugs). Among these bugs, parental care has evolved several times. Parental care varies from brooding of the eggs by the female, to a more active form that involves protection of young against predators and the female covering the nymphs under her body.

Superfamilies and families 
BioLib includes:
superfamily Cimicoidea Latreille, 1802
 Anthocoridae Fieber, 1837 – flower bugs, pirate bugs
 Cimicidae Latreille, 1802 – bedbugs
 Nabidae A. Costa, 1853 – damsel bugs
 Curaliidae Schuh, Weirauch & Henry, 2008
 Lasiochilidae
 Lyctocoridae Reuter, 1884
 Plokiophilidae China, 1953
 Polyctenidae Westwood, 1874 – Old World bat bugs

superfamily Miroidea Hahn, 1833
 Microphysidae Dohrn, 1859
 Miridae Hahn, 1833 – plant bugs
 Ebboidae Perrichot et al., 2006

superfamily Reduvioidea Latreille, 1807
 Reduviidae Latreille, 1807 – assassin and thread-legged bugs
 Ceresopseidae Becker-Migdisova, 1958
 Pachynomidae Stål, 1873
 Palaeotanyrhinidae Poinar, Brown & Kóbor, 2022†

superfamily Tingoidea Laporte, 1832
 Tingidae Laporte, 1832 – lace bugs
 Hispanocaderidae Golub & Popov, 2012 †
 Ignotingidae Zhang, Golub, Popov & Shcherbakov, 2005 †

superfamily Joppeicoidea Reuter, 1910
 Joppeicidae Reuter, 1910

superfamily Thaumastocoroidea Kirkaldy, 1908
 Thaumastocoridae Kirkaldy, 1908 – royal palm bugs

incertae sedis and other fossil taxa 
 Velocipedidae Bergroth, 1891
 Vetanthocoridae Yao et al., 2006 †
Torirostratidae Yao, Cai, Shih & Engel 2014 †
 genus Sternocoris Popov, 1986 †

References

External links
 True Bugs. Planetary Biodiversity Inventory.

 
Heteroptera
Insect infraorders